George L. DeLoach (born December 25, 1940) is an American politician. He was a member of the Georgia House of Representatives from 1995 to 2003. He is a member of the Republican party.

References

Living people
Republican Party members of the Georgia House of Representatives
1940 births
Place of birth missing (living people)
American funeral directors
21st-century American politicians